Canan or Janan is a Turkish female name from Persian origin, meaning beloved, it may refer to:

Given name
 Aslı Canan Sabırlı (born 1991), Turkish women's footballer
 Canan Bayram (born 1966), German lawyer and politician 
 Canan Dağdeviren (born 1985), Turkish materials scientist and academic
 Canan Ergüder (born 1977), Turkish actress
 Canan Kaftancıoğlu (born 1972), Turkish physician and politician
 Canan Karatay (born 1943), Turkish professor, medical doctor
 Canan Öztoprak (born 1955), Turkish Cypriot politician
 Canan Senol (born 1970), Turkish-Kurdish visual artist
 Canan Tolon (born 1955), Turkish artist

Surname
 Janine Canan, American poet and editor
 Samuel Canan, 34th Governor of American Samoa

See also
 Canan Station, Pennsylvania
 Cannan
 Canaan
 Canan (film)

Turkish feminine given names